Katherine M. Franke is an American legal scholar who specializes in gender and sexuality law. She is the James L. Dohr Professor of Law at Columbia Law School.

Biography 
Franke received her B.A. from Barnard College in 1981. She graduated from Northeastern University School of Law in 1986, before receiving her LL.M. from Yale Law School in 1993 and S.J.D. from Yale in 1999. 

Franke began practicing law in the 1980s as a civil rights litigator, having received a grant from the MacArthur Foundation to work on addressing social discrimination faced by people with AIDS. She then joined the New York City Commission on Human Rights as a supervising attorney in its newly created AIDS division. In 1990, Franke was named executive director of the National Lawyers Guild.

Franke began her academic career in 1995 at the James E. Rogers College of Law of the University of Arizona and then taught at Fordham University School of Law from 1997 until 2000, when she joined the Columbia Law faculty.

Franke received a Guggenheim Fellowship in 2011 to carry out research on the costs of winning marriage rights for same sex couples and African Americans during the mid-19th century, and the her research was published into the book Wedlocked: The Perils of Marriage Equality (2015).

In 2018, Franke traveled to Israel as part of a 14-member human rights delegation touring Israel and the West Bank. However, she was detained at Ben Gurion Airport in Tel Aviv before getting deported from the country. The Israeli authorities accused her of ties to the Boycott, Divestment and Sanctions movement.

Franke is gay.

References 

Living people

Year of birth missing (living people)
Barnard College alumni

Columbia Law School faculty
Yale Law School alumni
Northeastern University School of Law alumni
Fordham University faculty
University of Arizona faculty
20th-century American lawyers
LGBT academics